Saint-Maur-des-Fossés is a commune in Val-de-Marne, the southeastern suburbs of Paris, France.

History

The abbey
Saint-Maur-des-Fossés owes its name to Saint-Maur Abbey founded in 638 by Queen Nanthild, regent for her son Clovis II, at a place called Fossati in Medieval Latin, Les Fossés in modern French, meaning "the moats". This place, located at the narrow entrance of a loop where the river Marne made its way round a rocky outcrop, was probably named after the moats of an ancient Celtic oppidum and later a Roman castrum; the site was known in medieval documents as Castrum Bagaudarum, at a time when the marauding Bagaudae had developed a legendary reputation as defenders of Christians against Roman persecution.  Massive foundations, sited so far from a Roman frontier, were attributed by C. Jullian to a temple or a villa instead. In Merovingian times, Gallo-Roman villas in the royal fisc were repeatedly donated as sites for monasteries under royal patronage.

The abbey, dedicated to Saint Peter, Saint Paul and the Virgin Mary, was called Sanctus Petrus Fossatensis in Medieval Latin (Saint Pierre des Fossés in French), meaning "Saint Peter of the Moats". It was founded by Blidegisil, archdeacon of Paris, in 638. One of the early abbots was Saint Babolen (died ).
In 868, King Charles the Bald invited the monks of the Abbey of Saint-Maur de Glanfeuil (in Le Thoureil, Maine-et-Loire, western France), who had fled their abbey due to Viking invasion, to relocate to Saint Pierre des Fossés with their precious relics of Saint Maurus.

Later in the Middle Ages, the relics of Saint Maurus became very famous as they were supposed to heal gout and epilepsy, and Saint Pierre des Fossés became one of the most famous pilgrimage centers of medieval France. The rededication to Saint Maurus, in which abbey was renamed Saint-Maur-des-Fossés ("Saint Maurus of the Moats"), was justified by the story that during a drought in 1137, prayers to the Virgin and Saints Peter and Paul having been ineffective, prayer to Saint Maur brought the needed rainfall.

Château de Saint-Maur
The abbey was secularised in 1535, and in 1541, the architect Philibert Delorme designed a château on the site for Cardinal Jean du Bellay, bishop of Paris, on four ranges of building around a square central court. Catherine de' Medici was a frequent visitor, preferring it to the château de Vincennes; in 1563 she acquired this "château du Bellay", and substantially rebuilt it. On September 23, 1568, her teenage son, King Charles IX, issued the Edict of Saint-Maur, which prohibited all religions but Catholicism. It prompted fierce religious intolerance in Paris and eventually led to the 1572, St. Bartholomew's Day massacre. Building projects at the site were only interrupted by Catherine's death (1589); the château was sold to the Condé family and was eventually completed, and furnished with extensive parterres, at the end of the seventeenth century.

The Château de Saint-Maur, still in the possession of the Condé family, was nationalised during the French Revolution, emptied of its contents, and its terrains divided up among real-estate speculators. The structure was demolished for the value of its materials; virtually nothing remains.

The village

The little settlement that grew around the abbey, known as Saint-Maur-des-Fossés, developed a market during the thirteenth century. The present territory also includes a formerly distinct village,  La Varenne-Saint-Hilaire, against the perimeter of the nearby game preserve of Saint-Hilaire, part of the abbey's domaines.

In 1791, part of the territory of Saint-Maur-des-Fossés was detached and became the commune of La Branche-du-Pont-de-Saint-Maur, later renamed Joinville-le-Pont.

After the abbey itself was abandoned, its church providing building materials in the town. During the French Revolution, Saint-Maur-des-Fossés was temporarily renamed Vivant-sur-Marne (meaning "Alive upon Marne") in a gesture of rejection of religion.

After the Revolution, the official name of the commune was simply Saint-Maur; it is only in 1897 that "des-Fossés" was re-added to the name, probably to conform to the historical name and also to distinguish Saint-Maur-des-Fossés from other communes of France also called Saint-Maur. In 1924, a few vestiges of the abbey were collected in the newly established Musée du vieux Saint-Maur.

Famous residents

Vincenzo Peruggia, an Italian thief who stole the Mona Lisa on 21 August 1911, died in Saint-Maur-des-Fossés.

Philippe Diolé (1908 – 1977), diver, writer and explorer, was born in Saint-Maur-des-Fossés. Germaine Tailleferre (born 'Tallefesse'), (French: [19 April 1892 – 7 November 1983.  Composer and the only female member of the group of composers known as Les Six.

Manu Katché (born 27 October 1958 in Saint-Maur-des-Fossés) is a French drummer and songwriter.

Laurent Pimond (born 6 April 1965 in Saint-Maur-des-Fossés) is a French footballer.

Geography

Saint-Maur-des-Fossés is almost entirely surrounded by a loop of the river Marne.

Demographics

Population

Immigration

Politics

Saint-Maur leans to the right in presidential elections, giving François Fillon 33% of its votes in the first round of the 2017 French presidential election.

Transport
Saint-Maur-des-Fossés is served by four stations on Paris RER line A: Saint-Maur – Créteil, Le Parc de Saint-Maur, Champigny, and La Varenne – Chennevières.

Saint-Maur-des-Fossés is also served by many buses, like the TVM (Trans-Val-de-Marne), where Saint-Maur-Créteil is one of the bus terminal.

Education
There are 25 public preschools (écoles maternelles) and primary schools in the commune.

Public junior high schools:
Collège Le Parc
Collège Rabelais

Public senior high schools:

Lycée d'Arsonval
Lycée Condorcet

Private schools:
Ensemble scolaire Saint-André (preschool through junior high school)
Ecole et collège Jeanne D'Arc

Culture

Festivals
Saint-Maur-des-Fossés organize a Short Subject Festival. Prizes (2008) : "The Note" by Jon Greenhalgh and Anne-Élisabeth Blateau as best actress.

Film and literature
Saint-Maur-des-Fossés was the filming location for the old-Paris sections of the 1958 Academy award winning film Mon Oncle by Jacques Tati. A statue of Tati in character as Monsieur Hulot along with two other characters from the film is visible in the Commune at Place d'Arme.

Sport
US Lusitanos Saint-Maur was founded in 1966 by Portuguese immigrants who worked in a factory in the town. They play their games at the Stade Adolphe-Chéron.

Twin towns - sister cities

Saint-Maur-des-Fossés is twinned with:

 Ramat HaSharon, Israel
 Bognor Regis, United Kingdom
 Rimini, Italy
 La Louvière, Belgium
 Ziguinchor, Senegal
 Hamelin, Germany
 Leiria, Portugal
 Pforzheim, Germany

See also
Communes of the Val-de-Marne department

References

External links

City Website 

Historical and Archaeological Association
Site des conseillers municipaux de l'opposition (PS-PC)

Renaissance architecture in France
Communes of Val-de-Marne